Try Out may refer to:

 The Try Out, a 1916 American silent comedy film featuring Oliver Hardy
 Try Out (Kas Product album), the debut studio album by French coldwave band KaS Product

See also
 Tryout, an amateur press journal published from 1914 to 1946